Manzana, also known as manzanita and manzana verde, is a liqueur generally made of wild apples. The name refers to the apples and not the alcoholic beverage which is usually clear in color. It has Spanish origins, more precisely of the Basque country. Its name manzana is apple in Spanish; verde is Spanish for "green".

Manzana contains from 15 to 20% per volume of alcohol. It is sweet and tastes like green apples, similar in taste to pucker.

See also
Apple
Cider

References

Liqueurs
Spanish liqueurs
Distilled drinks
Apples